USS Endeavor was a 200-foot AFDL-1 Class Small Auxiliary floating drydock in service with the United States Navy during World War II. Built and delivered by Chicago Bridge and Iron in Morgan City, Louisiana in September 1943, she entered service as USS AFD-1. She was redesignated AFDL-1 on 1 August 1946. In 1986, she was decommissioned, struck from the Naval Register and transferred to the Dominican Republic and redesignated DF-1. She is currently in Active Service as of 2017.

It also shares the name with the Endeavour space shuttle, an orbital space vehicle used by NASA as an active participant in the construction of the International Space Station. Both vessels use the British English spelling of the word, rather than the American English form, in honor of the British HMS Endeavour, the ship of Captain James Cook on his first voyage of discovery (1768–1771).

Awards
American Campaign Medal
World War II Victory Medal
National Defense Service Medal with star

See also
USS Ability (AFDL-7)

References

External links
Youtube, BATTLESHIP USS IDAHO REPAIRED AT ESPIRITU SANTO in 1944 in USS Artisan (ABSD-1)1
Youtube, August 15, 1944 mighty battleship Idaho at ABSD-1
Youtube, Floating Dry Docks WWII
US Navy, Beans, Bullets, and Black Oil, The Story of Fleet Logistics Afloat in the Pacific During World War II

Drydocks
1943 ships
Floating drydocks of the United States Navy